Mental Images GmbH (stylized as mental images) was a German computer generated imagery (CGI) software firm based in Berlin, Germany, and was acquired by Nvidia in 2007, then rebranded as Nvidia Advanced Rendering Center (ARC), and is still providing similar products and technology. The company provides rendering and 3D modeling technology for entertainment, computer-aided design, scientific visualization and architecture.

The company was founded by the physicists and computer scientists Rolf Herken, Hans-Christian Hege, Robert Hödicke and Wolfgang Krüger and the economists Günter Ansorge, Frank Schnöckel and Hans Peter Plettner as a company with limited liability & private limited partnership (GmbH & Co. KG) in April 1986 in Berlin, Germany. The Mental Ray software project started in 1986. The first versions of the rendering software were influenced, tested and used for production by Mental Images' then operating large commercial computer animation division, led by the visual effects supervisors John Andrew Berton (1986-1989), 2000 Academy Award winner John Nelson (1987-1989), and 1996 and 2000 Academy Award nominee Stefen Fangmeier (1988-1990).

In 2003 Mental Images completed an investment round led by ViewPoint Ventures and another large international private equity investor. Since Dec 2007 Mental Images GmbH is a wholly owned subsidiary of the Nvidia corporation with headquarters in Berlin, subsidiaries in San Francisco (Mental Images Inc.) and Melbourne (Mental Images Pty. Ltd.) as well as an office in Stockholm. After acquisition by Nvidia the company has been renamed Nvidia Advanced Rendering Center (Nvidia ARC GmbH).

Products
Mental Images is the developer of the rendering software Mental Ray, iray, mental mill, RealityServer, and DiCE.

Filmography
 Mental Images (1987) (a short film of the same name)
 Asterix in America (1994) (3D computer animation "Storm Sequence" and digital effects, software development)
 Heaven (2002) (images computed with Mental Ray)

References

External links
 
 Technical Oscars: The 75th Scientific & Technical Awards 2002 / 2003
 
 mental images office at the Kant Dreieck tower
 

1986 establishments in Germany
2007 mergers and acquisitions
3D graphics software
3D imaging
Computer-aided design software
Nvidia
Software companies established in 1986
Software companies of Germany